Eriastrum sparsiflorum is an annual plant in the phlox family (Polemoniaceae) native to the Great Basin of the Western United States.

References

sparsiflorum
Flora of the Great Basin